Morten Jens Behrens (born 1 April 1997) is a German professional footballer who plays as a goalkeeper for German  club Waldhof Mannheim on loan from Darmstadt 98.

Career
Behrens made his professional debut for 1. FC Magdeburg in the first round of the 2019–20 DFB-Pokal on 10 August 2019, starting in the home match against Bundesliga club SC Freiburg.

On 20 June 2022, Behrens joined Waldhof Mannheim on loan.

References

External links
 
 

1997 births
Living people
People from Segeberg
Footballers from Schleswig-Holstein
German footballers
Association football goalkeepers
Hamburger SV II players
Hamburger SV players
1. FC Magdeburg players
SV Darmstadt 98 players
SV Waldhof Mannheim players
3. Liga players
Regionalliga players
2. Bundesliga players